Girls' Generation's Horror Movie Factory, commonly abbreviated to "H.M.F", is an MBC variety TV show starring the South Korean girl group Girls' Generation. The members (excluding Yoona who was not present during filming due to filming of her drama Cinderella Man) undergo various acting lessons and tests. The show started out with horror settings, but after a few episodes became more bright and cheerful.

Background 
After the cancellation of the  show Dae-mang, Horror Movie Factory was introduced as MBC's new Sunday Sunday Night program alongside Quiz Prince in early May. A press conference was held at the MBC Dream Center in Ilsan, Gyeonggi-do to announce the new show. The show revolves around the members of Girls' Generation going through acting exercises and games under the instruction of comedians Kim Shin-young, Jo Hye-Ryun and Yoo Se-yoon, who are the 3 MCs on the show. The first 3 episodes revolve around the members in a haunted-school horror film-like acting test, while the last 3 show the members receiving direct instruction from actor Lee Bumsoo. The show premiered on May 3, 2009.

Episodes

Ratings 
Despite the popularity of Girls' Generation, the show was unable to raise the ratings of MBC's Sunday Sunday Night segment, and was canceled after 6 episodes for receiving low viewership. The premiere episode had ratings of 3.3%. The show was then replaced with another show starring Girls' Generation titled Himnae-ra-him!/Cheer Up!

References

External links
 Official Homepage 

MBC TV original programming
Girls' Generation television series
2009 South Korean television series debuts
2009 South Korean television series endings